Petra Mandula and Patricia Wartusch were the defending champions from 2001, but they chose not to compete in 2002. 

Tatiana Perebiynis and Tatiana Poutchek defended their title, by defeating Mia Buric and Galina Fokina 7–5, and 6–2 in the final.

Seeds

Draw

Draw

References

Doubles
Tashkent Open
2002 in Uzbekistani sport